Annette de la Renta (born 24 December 1939) is an American philanthropist and socialite, the widow of the Dominican fashion designer Oscar de la Renta. She was named to the International Best Dressed List Hall of Fame in 1973.

Birth and childhood
Born in Nice, France, as Anne France Mannheimer and nicknamed Annette, she is the only child of a German Jewish banker, Fritz Mannheimer (1890–1939), who died before her birth, and his Roman Catholic wife, Mary Jane Reiss (1917-2004, aka Marie Annette Jane Reiss, aka Jane Engelhard). Her German-born maternal grandfather, Hugo Reiss, was a German Jewish businessman in Shanghai, China, where he served as the Brazilian consul; and her maternal grandmother, Mary Ignatius Murphy, was a Roman Catholic of Irish descent from San Francisco. In 1947, after her mother moved to the United States and remarried, Annette Mannheimer was adopted by her stepfather, Charles W. Engelhard Jr., an industrial magnate, and became Annette Engelhard; she became an American citizen in 1966. She was raised in the Roman Catholic faith of her mother.

Marriages and family life
In 1960, she married private investor Samuel Pryor Reed (1934 - 2005) in a Roman Catholic ceremony in Bernardsville, New Jersey. He was a vice president of Engelhard Industries, the minerals conglomerate; who later owned American Heritage magazine. Reed and Annette eventually divorced. The couple had three children:
 Beatrice Anne Reed, who married: (1) Roger Albert Morrison (they had three children: Katherine, Charles, and Nicholas)  (2) David Niven Jr., a son of the actor David Niven (3) David Phelps, a California real estate attorney
 Eliza Reed, who married Alexander Lytton Bolen in Newark, New Jersey. Bolen serves as CEO of Oscar de la Renta, L.L.C. They have three children: Henry, Thomas, and Phillip. 
 Charles Reed, who married Natalie Wigotsky, a clinical psychologist. They have three children: Nicholas, William, and Charles Jr.

On 26 December 1989, she married fashion designer Oscar de la Renta in La Romana, Dominican Republic, becoming step-mother of his adopted son, Moises de la Renta.

On 26 July 2006, Annette de la Renta was appointed temporary guardian of the 104-year-old Brooke Astor, a long-time friend, in the wake of elder abuse allegations being made against Astor's son, Anthony Dryden Marshall. On 13 October 2006, de la Renta became permanent guardian.  On 20 October 2014, her husband, Oscar de la Renta, died of cancer, at age 82.

Philanthropy
De la Renta serves on the boards of the Metropolitan Museum, the New York Public Library, the Morgan Library, the Animal Medical Center, and the Engelhard Foundation. She also served on the board of directors of Rockefeller University for 25 years, and now serves as a trustee emeritus.

References

1939 births
American philanthropists
American people of German-Jewish descent
American people of Irish descent
American Roman Catholics
Living people
American socialites
People from Nice
French emigrants to the United States